Clavel Kayitaré (born 1986 in Kayonza, Rwanda) is a Paralympian athlete from France competing mainly in category T42 sprint events.

Kayitaré won two silver sin the 2004 Summer Paralympics in Athens in  the T42 class 100m and 200m.  In Beijing in 2008 he was unable to win a medal in either the 100m or as part of the French team in the T42-46 4 × 100 m relay.

References

External links

 
 

Paralympic athletes of France
Athletes (track and field) at the 2004 Summer Paralympics
Athletes (track and field) at the 2008 Summer Paralympics
Paralympic silver medalists for France
French male sprinters
Living people
1986 births
French people of Rwandan descent
Medalists at the 2004 Summer Paralympics
Paralympic medalists in athletics (track and field)
Athletes (track and field) at the 2020 Summer Paralympics